Gil Riviere is an American politician who served as a Democratic member of the Hawaii Senate for the 23rd district from 2015 to 2023. He previously served as a Republican representative from Hawaii's 46th district.

Elections

Hawaii House of Representatives elections 
Riviere won the November 2, 2010 general election for Representative from Hawaii's District 46 against Larry Sagaysay with 54.2% of the vote. He was unopposed in the Republican primary for the office. Riviere ran in the 2012 Republican primary for Representative of Hawaii's District 47, and was defeated by Richard Fale on August 11, 2012 with 47.2% of the vote.

Hawaii State Senate elections 
Riviere won the November 4th, 2014 general election for Senator to represent Hawaii's District 23 against Richard Fale, his primary opponent who won in the 2012 election for Representative of Hawaii's District 47. Riviere won with 52.3% of the vote.

Riviere ran unopposed in the November 6th, 2018 general election for Senator of Hawaii's District 23. He was challenged by Clayton Hee in the Democratic primary for the seat, but won with 66.8% of the vote.

References

External links 

 Campaign Website
 Hawaii State Legislature website profile

Year of birth missing (living people)
Living people
Democratic Party Hawaii state senators
21st-century American politicians